Alison Castle is an American photographer and book editor who most prominently worked on The Stanley Kubrick Archives for Taschen She is also the editor of Linda McCartney's Life in Photography, Some Like It Hot, Kubrick's Napoleon: The Greatest Movie Never Made, Marc Newson: Works, and Saturday Night Live: The Book, all published by TASCHEN.

From 2012 to 2019 she worked on a major, 5-volume retrospective of the life and work of Jacques Tati, published by TASCHEN in the fall of 2019.

Castle is the daughter of Nancy Jurs and Wendell Castle, prominent artists who reside in Scottsville, New York. She attended Allendale Columbia School in Pittsford.

Castle studied philosophy as an undergraduate at Columbia University and received her graduate degree in photography and film from the New York University/International Center of Photography masters program. She lived in Paris for 15 years before turning to the US and is currently living in Brooklyn.

References

Living people
American women photographers
Columbia College (New York) alumni
Year of birth missing (living people)
New York University alumni
21st-century American women